Stephanie McMillan (born 1965) is an American political cartoonist, editorialist, and activist from South Florida. A granddaughter of the German commercial animator Hans Fischerkoesen, McMillan aspired to become a cartoonist from the age of ten. During her high school years, she began organizing protests against capitalism and imperialism.

Early life and career
McMillan graduated from Tisch School of the Arts at New York University in 1987 with a BFA in film. During her time at NYU, she studied animation under Richard Protovin and John Canemaker, and received an award for her student film.  In 1992, McMillan was offered her first professional cartooning opportunity as an editorial assistant at XS- magazine/City Link, an alt-newsweekly. By 1999, McMillan began self-syndicating her cartoons, as well as providing exclusive comic features and illustrations for hundreds of publications worldwide. Her work has appeared in the Los Angeles Times, Daily Beast, South Florida Sun-Sentinel, Yes! Magazine, Comic Relief, Amarillo Globe-News, Funny Times, Yahoo.com, and the San Francisco Bay Guardian.
 
Beyond her professional cartooning, McMillan has been an organizer against capitalism and imperialism all her life. The groups she has worked with include One Struggle, Refuse and Resist!, the Occupy movement throughout the country, U.S. Hands Off the Haitian People's Coalition, and the Revolutionary Communist Youth Brigade. In 2012, McMillan won the Robert F. Kennedy Journalism Award for Editorial Cartoonists for her work as a political cartoonist.

Currently, McMillan’s daily comic strip, Minimum Security, is syndicated online at Universal Uclick’s gocomics.com. She also draws a weekly editorial cartoon, Code Green, acts as an editor and designer for The Notebook (Association of American Editorial Cartoonists), and does freelance illustration and writing. Her own books include Capitalism Must Die! A Basic Introduction: What capitalism is, why it sucks, and how to crush it (INIP—Idées Nouvelles Idées Prolétariennes, 2014), The Beginning of the American Fall (Seven Stories Press, 2012), and As The World Burns: 50 Simple Things You Can Do to Stay in Denial with Derrick Jensen (Seven Stories Press, 2007).

Books
 2012 — Capitalism Must Die! A Basic Introduction: What capitalism is, why it sucks, and how to crush it (text with comics), INIP (Idées Nouvelles Idées Prolétariennes)
 2013 — The Minimum Security Chronicles: Resistance to Ecocide (graphic novel), Seven Stories Press
 2012 — The Beginning of the American Fall (comics journalism about the Occupy protests), Seven Stories Press
 2012 — The Knitting Circle Rapist Annihilation Squad (novel with Derrick Jensen), PM Press/Flashpoint
 2010 — Mischief in the Forest: A Yarn Yarn (children’s book with Derrick Jensen), PM Press/Flashpoint
 2010 — Pendant Que la Planète Flambe (French edition of As the World Burns), La Boîte à Bulles
 2009 — Excessive Force (anthology), Last Hours, UK
 2007 — As the World Burns: 50 Simple Things You Can Do to Stay in Denial (graphic novel with Derrick Jensen), Seven Stories Press (Nominated by National Library Association as a Great Graphic Novel for Teens, 2008)
 2005 —Attitude Presents Minimum Security (cartoon collection), NBM Publishing
 2002 — Attitude: The New Subversive Cartoonists (anthology), NBM Publishing
 Various textbooks, and several books in the Opposing Viewpoints series by Gale Publishing Group

Awards
 2012 — Robert F. Kennedy Journalism Award for Editorial Cartoons
 2011 — Scripps Howard Award for Editorial Cartooning (Finalist)
 2010 — Sigma Delta Chi Award for editorial cartoons, Society of Professional Journalists
 2010 — Press Action Cartoonist of the Year
 2008 — Press Action Dynamic Dozen
 2005 and 2003 — First Place, Excellence in Postal Union Journalism, APWU National Postal Press Association
 2000 — Honorable Mention, Creative Resistance Contest, Adbusters
 1997 and 1994 — First Place, General Excellence in Editorial Cartooning, Florida Press Club
 1996 — Second Place, General Excellence in Artist Illustration, Florida Press Club

References

External links

Official website
Profile at Editorialcartoonists.com
Onestrugglesouthflorida.wordpress.com

1965 births
Living people
Activists from Florida
American anti-capitalists
American social activists
American women cartoonists
Political artists
Tisch School of the Arts alumni
Date of birth missing (living people)
Place of birth missing (living people)
American cartoonists